2006–07 Országos Bajnokság I (men's water polo) was the 101st water polo championship in Hungary.

First stage 

Pld - Played; W - Won; L - Lost; PF - Points for; PA - Points against; Diff - Difference; Pts - Points.

Championship Playoff

European competition Playoff

Seventh place 

|}

Relegation Playoff

Final standing

Sources 
Magyar sportévkönyv 2008

Seasons in Hungarian water polo competitions
Hungary
2006 in water polo
2006 in Hungarian sport
2007 in water polo
2007 in Hungarian sport